Smiley Face Killers is a 2020 American slasher film directed by Tim Hunter and written by Bret Easton Ellis, loosely based on the Smiley face murder theory. The film stars Ronen Rubinstein, Mia Serafino, and Crispin Glover.

Synopsis
The film opens with the abduction and murder of two unrelated victims by a hooded killer in a white van. The only clue linking the murders is the presence of smiley face graffiti near the body. The film then shows Jake, a university student who believes that someone is stalking him, as they have left him a map marking the locations of the prior smiley face murders along with creepy text messages and photos. His girlfriend Keren is concerned that he is off his psychiatric medication, particularly after he grows jealous of her talking to her ex-boyfriend Rob. Jake relates the strange events to his friend Adam, who theorizes that Rob may be doing them out of jealousy. He begins to investigate the map and messages with more earnest, all the time unaware that the stalker, a mysterious hooded figure, has murdered his roommate Devon.

Jake discovers messages from Rob on Keren's phone and the two argue, causing her to further worry and assume that his concerns are due to non-compliance with his meds. He continues the fight later when he discovers Rob at a party, during which he pushes Keren. Upset, Jake leaves the party and is swiftly abducted by his stalker and two other hooded figures, one of whom begins to drain his blood. An attempt to free himself is only momentarily successful and results in the death of a gas station clerk and a group of teenagers who happened to drive up. Jake is then killed by the figures, who dump his body and graffiti a smiley face. Devon's death is eventually discovered and it's generally believed that Jake murdered him. The film ends with the hooded figures stalking their next victim.

Cast
 Ronen Rubinstein as Jake Graham
 Mia Serafino as Keren
 Crispin Glover as Hooded Figure
 Amadeus Serafini as Gabriel
 Ashley Rickards as Alana
 Garrett Coffey as Adam
 Cody Simpson as Rob
 Daniel Covin as Devon
 Gianna DiDonato as Liv
 Rachel Crowl as Woman Killer
 Daniel Dannas as Ryan Elliot
 Reese Mishler as Brandon Douglas
 Corey Prather as Paul Lader

Production
In October 2017, production was announced to have begun. Ronen Rubinstein was cast in the lead role and Crispin Glover in a supporting role, with Tim Hunter directing a screenplay by Bret Easton Ellis.

Release
Smiley Face Killers was released on video on demand, DVD and Blu-ray on December 4, 2020.

Reception 

Marketing
On October 8, 2020, the official poster and trailer for the film were unveiled by Lionsgate. Ronen Rubinstein expressed his frustration towards the studio's approach to the marketing and apparent lack of support for the film. Following a month-long dispute with the studio, Trenton Ryder confirmed on Twitter the film's social marketing assets were back in his control after being removed ahead of the film's release.

References

External links
 

2020 films
2020 direct-to-video films
2020 horror films
2020 independent films
2020s serial killer films
2020s slasher films
American direct-to-video films
American independent films
American serial killer films
American slasher films
Direct-to-video horror films
Films directed by Tim Hunter
Films set in Santa Cruz County, California
Films shot in Los Angeles
Films shot in Los Angeles County, California
Lionsgate films
2020s English-language films
2020s American films